Korovyev (spelled Koroviev in the Penguin Classics edition) is one of Woland's entourage in Mikhail Bulgakov's novel, The Master and Margarita. He presents himself to others as "professor" Woland's "assistant and translator," and is capable of creating any illusion. His appearance is characterized throughout the book by a lengthy build, a jockey's cap, a mustache, and a pince-nez with one cracked lens and the other lens missing. He is alternately depicted wearing a checkered jacket and checkered trousers.

We first meet Koroviev at a turnstile to which Berlioz is rushing after having been thoroughly creeped out by his first encounter with Woland. He is not named until much later, when meeting with Nikanor Ivanovich. He is only occasionally referred to as Fagott ("bassoon") by the narrator and by Woland. (In the Penguin Classics edition, there is no o at the end of Fagott.)

Koroviev is purported to be an "ex-choirmaster." He is close with the mischievous Behemoth, the oversized-cat-like demon in Woland's party who can alter his appearance at will to seem like a human man. In Chapter 28, "The Last Adventures of Koroviev and Behemoth," the gruesome twosome wreaks havoc around town, sowing confusion at Smolensky marketplace and starting a fire at  Griboedov's, a restaurant and meeting house for Russia's literary elite.

Personality

Koroviev has a clownish temperament, speaking loudly and with a flourish while dressing in a manner certain to call attention to himself. He enjoys telling blatant lies, such as pretending to Ivan when the latter returns from the site where Berlioz died that Woland, to whom Ivan had just recently been speaking, all of a sudden cannot speak Russian; and declaring confidently to the door attendant at Griboedov's that both he and Behemoth the Cat Demon are in fact writers. He has an excitable nature, lamenting with comical dramatic flair when he fancies himself mistreated or when someone refuses to believe his lies.

Koroviev also relishes opportunities to accuse others of wrongdoing and to threaten them, such as accusing Ivan of harassing Woland when the latter pretends he cannot speak Russian ("What're you doing bothering a foreign tourist? For that you'll incur severe punishment!") and threatening a shopkeeper who warns him that "We only accept currency" that he will file a complaint with the manager and "tell him such tales about you that you may have to surrender your post between the shining mirrored doors."

Koroviev enjoys manipulating people into incriminating themselves, and is quite adept at it. When Nikanor Ivanovich, chairman of a tenants' association, hesitates to accept a wad of cash from Koroviev on behalf of Woland for the latter to occupy the late Berlioz's apartment because it's "severely punishable" and "not done," Koroviev insists: "With us it's not done, but with foreigners it is. You'll offend him, Nikanor Ivanovich, and that's embarrassing...But where are the witnesses? I ask you, where are they?"

Unlike Behemoth and Azazello, Koroviev does not directly commit acts of violence at any point.

References

Characters in fantasy literature
Characters in Russian novels of the 20th century
Mikhail Bulgakov characters
Fictional demons and devils
Literary characters introduced in 1966
Male literary villains
Comedy literature characters